The Latin Cup was an international football tournament for club sides from the Southwest European nations of France, Italy, Spain, and Portugal. In 1949 the football federations came together and requested FIFA to launch the competition. European clubs could not afford hefty travel costs so competition was staged at the end of every season in a single host country. The competition featured two semi-finals, a third place play-off and a final.

This competition is considered a predecessor of club tournaments in Europe, namely the European Cup, the first edition of which was held in 1955.

History
The tournament began in 1949 and was usually played between the league champions of each of the participating countries. Every four years, a ranking would be determined for the countries based on their sides' performances in the Latin Cup. The competition was last played for in 1957, two years after the introduction of the UEFA-sanctioned European Cup. Real Madrid played in and won both the European Cup and the Latin Cup in 1957.

Prior to the introduction of the European Cup, the Latin Cup was considered the most important cup for clubs in Europe, the longer-established Mitropa Cup having gone into decline after World War II. The Latin Cup has been described one of the forerunners "of the European Cup" by UEFA.

According to Jules Rimet, 3rd President of FIFA, the Latin Cup was a competition created by FIFA at request of the four nations that contested it, but its regulation was made by a committee composed of members from the competing federations, and FIFA did not participate actively in its organisation.

The Latin Cup was based on cycles of 4 years, being held in one country each year. The champion of each edition achieved the most points (4) to its Federation while teams placed 2nd, 3rd and 4th received 3, 2 and 1 points respectively. Moreover, the Federation which totalised the most points every four years received the trophy, while the champion club was given a smaller replica of it.

The first edition was opened on 20 June 1949, with the Sporting CP vs Torino at Chamartín Stadium of Madrid. One month before 18 of Torino players had died at Superga air disaster. Barcelona would be the first champion of the tournament after beating Sporting 2–1 at the final.

The second edition clashed with 1950 FIFA World Cup of Brazil so most of the players of league champions were called up by their respective national teams. Therefore, Lazio, the fourth of Serie A, participated in the Latin Cup that year. In 1951, French runners-up Lille OSC replaced French champions Nice, who relinquished the 1951 Latin Cup in order to play the Copa Rio. Due to a fixture clash with the 1954 FIFA World Cup in Switzerland, no Latin Cup was held that year (the participants would have been Real Madrid, Sporting CP, Lille OSC and Internazionale—the latter did not get another chance to enter).

After the first four editions played, the Royal Spanish Football Federation won the first cycle with a total of twelve points, eight of them contributed by Barcelona and four by Atlético Madrid.

Results
All teams were champions of the preceding domestic season in each nation, except where it indicates, detailing their finishing position in respective leagues.

Titles by club

Titles by country

Top scorers by year

See also 
Mitropa Cup
Balkans Cup

References

External links

Latin Cup on RSSSF

 
Defunct international club association football competitions in Europe
Recurring sporting events established in 1949
Recurring sporting events disestablished in 1957
1949 establishments in Europe
1957 disestablishments in Europe